Michael Louis Gargiulo (born February 12, 1960) is an American television news anchor at WNBC (News 4 New York), NBC’s flagship station. He has anchored Today in New York with Darlene Rodriguez since 2008, and has been embedded with United States military units in Afghanistan, Iraq, Kuwait, and the Persian Gulf.

Early life and education
Gargiulo was born and raised in Manhattan, New York. He is of Italian ancestry and is the child of Mike and Dorothy Gargiulo. He has a sister, Susan Gargiulo.

Gargiulo graduated from Xavier High School and went on to attend New York University, where he received a bachelor's degree in history and studied Italian, French, Russian, and German.

Career

WSAZ, NBC's affiliate in Charleston, West Virginia, hired Gargiulo in 1984 to host the local edition of the syndicated show PM Magazine. He then worked as a reporter and anchor at WYOU, the CBS affiliate in Scranton, Pennsylvania. In the early 1990s, he went to WLKY in Louisville, Kentucky—then an ABC affiliate; now part of CBS—as a reporter. 

From 1993 to 1997, he was a reporter and anchor at KSTP-TV in Minneapolis. He served as the Washington, D.C., correspondent for Hearst-Argyle Television from 1997 to 2000, and then anchored the morning newscast on WTTG, a Fox-owned station in Washington, from 2000 to 2006.

In July 2006, Gargiulo joined WNBC as a general assignment reporter and was then named anchor of Weekend Today in New York. In October 2007, he was named anchor of the station's 5:30pm newscast along with Sue Simmons, and he replaced Rob Morrison as co-anchor of Today in New York in May 2008. During his tenure at WNBC, he has also been a co-host of Nonstop Rundown, with Erika Tarantal and Tracie Strahan.

As an anchor at WNBC, he has led coverage of many major news events, including Pope Benedict XVI's visit to the United States, the commissioning of the USS New York, President Barack Obama's visit to Ground Zero after Osama bin Laden's death, Hurricanes Irene and Sandy, the New York Giants' ticker-tape parade, the 2012 Empire State Building shooting, the Sandy Hook Elementary School shooting, and the death of Ed Koch. 

In 2014, he traveled to eastern Afghanistan to cover the last deployment of a unit of the United States Army's 10th Mountain Division. He reported on the same division in Iraq in 2007, and had also reported from Kuwait and Iraq in 2004.

Gargiulo has occasionally appeared on the Nickelodeon series Team Umizoomi, playing a reporter.

Awards and honors
Gargiulo won an Emmy Award for breaking news coverage in 2009 for his reporting on a crane collapse on the Upper East Side. In 2010, he and Erika Tarantal won an Emmy for best morning newscast for Today in New York. He won another breaking news Emmy in 2013, and in 2014, he and his WNBC colleagues won the Emmy Award for Outstanding Regional News Story–Spot News for their coverage of Hurricane Sandy.

In September 2012, Gargiulo appeared with Lauren Calvo in a PSA for Lighthouse International's Double Up 4 Vision event. That October, he was the master of ceremonies for the Epiphany School Foundation's annual Walkathon and was honored by the organization, and the following year, the Roman Catholic Diocese of Brooklyn honored him for his reporting. In June 2016, the National Italian American Foundation launched a scholarship named for him, the NIAF Michael Gargiulo Scholarship in Broadcasting and Communications.

Personal life
Gargiulo was a Roman Catholic during his early years until his marriage to Shannon Powell on October 10, 1998; but he was converted to Episcopal in 2015. He and Powell, with whom he has a son and a daughter, currently live in Larchmont, New York. Michael also serves as a teacher at The Center for Continuing Education in Mamaroneck.

On March 23, 2022, in his post on social media, Michael announced that he is testing positive for COVID-19, after they spending their vacation in Mount Snow, Vermont in the previous week. He said that it was fully vaccinated and boosted from the virus.

Television

Career timeline
1984–1987: WSAZ-TV reporter; PM Magazine host
1987–1991: WYOU anchor and reporter
1991–1993: WLKY reporter
1993–1997: KSTP-TV reporter and anchor of weekend newscasts
1997–2000: Hearst Television White House correspondent
2000–2006: WTTG anchor of weekday morning news
2006–present: WNBC
2006–2007: general assignment reporter
2007: anchor of weekend morning newscasts
2007–2008: anchor of weekday 5:30 newscasts
2008: anchor of weekday 5:00 newscasts
2008–present: anchor of weekday morning newscasts
2010–2011: Nonstop Rundown host

References

External links
Michael Gargiulo's bio on NBC New York

American television journalists
New York University alumni
New York (state) television reporters
Television anchors from New York City
1960 births
Living people
American male journalists